Sant Martí is the name of a Barcelona metro station located in the Sant Martí district of the city, opened in 1997. It is located under Carrer de Guipúscoa, between Carrer Agricultura and Carrer Cantàbria, with an access on each side. The station is served by L2 and is fully adapted for disabled people.

Services

External links

Sant Martí at Trenscat.com

Railway stations in Spain opened in 1997
Transport in Sant Martí (district)
Barcelona Metro line 2 stations